Crassispira recurvirostrata is a species of sea snail, a marine gastropod mollusc in the family Pseudomelatomidae.

Description
The length of the shell attains 50 mm.

Distribution
This marine species occurs off Japan and the Philippines.

References

External links
 

recurvirostrata
Gastropods described in 1972